The Institute of Culinary Education (ICE) is a private for-profit culinary college in New York City. ICE is accredited by the Accrediting Commission of Career Schools and Colleges (ACCSC), and offers career training diploma programs in the culinary arts. The school runs one of the largest program of hands-on recreational cooking classes and wine education courses in the country with more than 26,000 enthusiasts taking any of the 1,500 classes offered each year.

History
ICE traces its roots to 1975, when Peter Kump opened Peter Kump's New York Cooking School, one of the first culinary schools in New York City. Kump's philosophy was to concentrate on teaching cooking techniques and flavor development at a time when most other cooking schools were only teaching recipes.

In 1983, Kump inaugurated a professional program to train aspiring chefs. A number of his former teachers, including James Beard, Simone Beck, Marcella Hazan and Diana Kennedy taught classes. A number of other notable chefs, including Julia Child, James Peterson, David Bouley, and Jacques Pépin, were frequent guest instructors.

When Kump died in 1995, the school was acquired by Rick Smilow, an entrepreneur with an interest in education and the culinary arts.

After the acquisition, the school's professional programs expanded, requiring a move to a new location in the Flatiron neighborhood of the Manhattan borough of New York City at 50 W. 23rd Street, where it then expanded twice, in 1999 and 2004, growing to 45,000 square feet over seven floors. In 1999, the older East 92nd Street facility was closed.

In 2001, the school's name was changed to The Institute of Culinary Education.

In 2015, the school relocated to a brand new, 74,000 square foot facility in Battery Park City that includes such amenities as the nation's first education-focused bean-to-bar chocolate lab, a hydroponic herb and vegetable garden, a culinary technology lab, and a state-of-the-art mixology bar.

The International Culinary Center (ICC), a private, for-profit culinary school headquartered in New York City, merged into the Institute of Culinary Education in 2020. The ICC was founded as The French Culinary Institute by Dorothy Cann Hamilton in 1984.

Facilities
ICE operates out of a single floor, 74,000 square foot facility that includes 12 teaching kitchens, a demonstration kitchen, three traditional classrooms and various special amenities, including:

 Culinary classrooms equipped with gas, French top and induction burners, representing the full range of preferred cooking methods across the globe
 Pastry kitchens outfitted with Hobart mixers, steam-injected triple deck ovens, specialty chocolate equipment, blast freezers, high volume dough sheeters and more
 Culinary Technology Lab featuring modernist cooking equipment, as well as specialty tandoor, plancha, rotisserie and stone hearth ovens
 A featured kitchen outfitted with a Jade island range – ideal for teaching “brigade” style cooking
 The nation's first education-focused bean-to-bar chocolate lab
 Dedicated spaces for mixology and wine studies
 An indoor hydroponic herb garden and vegetable farm

Awards and honors
 In 2016, ICE was named the best culinary school in America by The Daily Meal website.
 In 2015, ICE received the International Association of Culinary Professionals (IACP) award for "Culinary School of Excellence." ICE has previously won IACP awards in 2003, 2008 and 2011 including “Best Vocational Culinary Institute” and “Best Recreational Cooking School."
 In 2006, ICE was named a “School of Distinction” by the school's accrediting agency, the ACCSC, and in 2010 ICE's Career Services Department received an ACCSC commendation for excellence.

Notable alumni
 Colin Alevras - Chef
 Mashama Bailey - Chef
 Vivian Howard - Chef and Peabody Award-winning host of A Chef's Life on PBS
 Brad Leone - Former Test Kitchen Manager at Bon Appétit
 Marc Murphy - Chef, restaurateur, and judge on Food Network's Chopped
 Denisse Oller - Journalist
 Gail Simmons  - Judge on Bravo's Top Chef
 Carl Albert Ruiz  - Chef La Cubana, Judge and Contestant on Guy's Grocery Games, Podcaster Opie Radio
 Bobby Flay - Celebrity chef and restaurateur. Graduated in 1984 from predecessor school The French Culinary Institute.

References

External links 
 Official website

 
Cooking schools in the United States
Educational institutions established in 1975
Hospitality schools in the United States
1975 establishments in New York City
Private universities and colleges in New York City